Chris Craymer is a British lifestyle photographer who also specializes in fashion, beauty, and portrait photography. He has had a number of books published.

Photography
Craymer's work consists of fashion, beauty, romance, and celebrity portraits for commercial and editorial use. He specializes in beauty, fashion, and interiors.

His work has appeared in editorials in Vogue Britain, Vanity Fair Italia, Condé Nast Traveler, and Harper's Bazaar and Queen. He has shot advertising campaigns for Clarins, Clean and Clear, Dove, Neutrogena, and Ligne Roset.

In March 2009, Craymer published his photo book Romance, which consists of a collection of images of real-life couples. He enlisted the help of real life couples who had a strong sense of personal style and individuality. The Mulberry store hosted events in New York City, London, and Hong Kong on the occasion of the release of the book.

Publications
The Kiss. Quadrille, 2005. .
Romance. Bene Factum, 2009. .
In London. Bene Factum, 2012. .
From the Heart. Damiani, 2016. .
American Romance. Damiani, 2018. .

References

External links 
Chris Craymer's website

English photographers
Living people
Year of birth missing (living people)